Monumental may refer to:

 In the manner of a monument

Places
 Monumental Island, Nunavut, Canada
 Monumental Island, New Zealand
 Monumental (Barcelona Metro), a station in Barcelona, Catalonia, Spain
 La Monumental, the Plaza Monumental de Barcelona, a stadium bullring in the city of Barcelona, Catalonia, Spain
 Estadio Monumental Antonio Vespucio Liberti, or El Monumental, an Argentinian stadium in Buenos Aires
 Plaza Monumental de Morelia, Michoacan, Mexico
 Monumental Square (Alcaraz), Spain
 Monumental Church, Richmond, Virginia, USA

Other uses
 Monumental (album), a 2011 album by Pete Rock and Smif-N-Wessun, and its title track
 Monumental (Kadebostany album), 2018
 Monumental: In Search of America's National Treasure, a 2012 American documentary film
 Monumental Life Insurance Company

See also

Monumental dance, a dance style introduced by German musical band E Nomine
Estadio Monumental (disambiguation)
Cine Monumental (disambiguation)
Monumentale (Milan Metro), a station in Milan, Italy

Monument (disambiguation)